Haq ol Khvajeh (also Romanized as Ḩaq ol Khvājeh, Haq-ol-Khayajeh, Ḩaqq el Khvājeh, and Ḩaqq ol Khvājeh; also known as Āghel Khvājeh, Akīl Khvājeh, ‘Aqel Khvājeh, and ‘Aqīl Khvājeh) is a village in Nardin Rural District, Kalpush District, Meyami County, Semnan Province, Iran. At the 2006 census, its population was 481, in 128 families.

References 

Populated places in Meyami County